Lolly Vegas (born Candido Albelando Vasquez-Vegas; October 2, 1939 – March 4, 2010) was a Mexican American musician of Indigenous descent. He played in numerous ensembles with his brother, Pat, including Pat & Lolly Vegas, The Avantis and Redbone. The brothers have Yaqui, Shoshone and Mexican heritage.

Background
Candido Albelando Vasquez-Vegas was born in Fresno, California. He and his brother, Pat  played in bands around the Fresno area. They shortened their last name to Vegas when they relocated to Los Angeles in 1963 to pursue their musical career.

The brothers performed as the Vegas Brothers before changing the name of their group to Redbone. Their 1974 hit "Come and Get Your Love" charted at No. 5 in the U.S.

Career
Together with brother Pat, Lolly led a band called The Avantis. The ensemble also consisted of drummer Mike Kowalski and guitarist Danny Hamilton. They became a support act for the Beach Boys. The Avantis did some work with Judd Hamilton (older brother of Dan Hamilton) who was the arranger and co-composer on their records. In 1963 The Avantis had a minor hit with "Wax 'Em Down".  The single was distributed in Canada by Sparton of Canada Ltd where it made the charts. On October 12, 1963, Canada's C-FUNTASTIC FIFTY recorded the single's chart status as having moved up one notch from the previous week's position of 36 to 37, putting it right behind "Fools Rush In" by Rick Nelson.

Vegas co-wrote the Rick Lancelot & The Peppermint Sticks single "Sick Chick" / "Ain't That Soul" which was released in 1964. Rick Lancelot was in fact Ricky Lancelotti. Vegas also wrote "Love Will Make You Crawl" for Cliff Wagner which was the B-side to his 1966 single, "Exception to the Rule".

In 1969, along with his brother Pat, rhythm guitarist Tony Bellamy and drummer Pete DePoe he formed the band Redbone, for which he was the lead singer. The band produced the singles "Maggie", "The Witch Queen of New Orleans", and their biggest hit "Come and Get Your Love".

Death
Vegas died of lung cancer in the Reseda neighborhood of Los Angeles on March 4, 2010, at age 70. He had been in poor health after suffering a stroke 15 years earlier.

Solo discography

References

Further reading 
 Come And Get Your Love: A Celebratory Ode to Redbone (1939–Present) by Pat "Redbone" Vegas, Rehbon Publishing, 2017, 280 pps.
 King Kong Pete: Redbone and Beyond by Peter "Last Walking Bear" DePoe, King Kong Beat Publishing, 2017, 292 pps.

External links
 
 
 
 Punchland: Interview: Pat Vegas of Redbone

1939 births
2010 deaths
Surf musicians
American people of Shoshone descent
American people of Yaqui descent
American rock guitarists
People from Fresno, California
Redbone (band) members
The Avantis members
Deaths from lung cancer in California